Alien Shores is the second studio album by Platinum Blonde Released by Columbia/CBS Records Canada in 1985, it contained one of the band's biggest Canadian hits with "Crying Over You" and their only US hit, "Somebody Somewhere". The album reached a high of 3 on the Canadian charts.

This album was the first to feature Kenny MacLean as a full-time bassist and keyboardist. This freed lead singer Mark Holmes to focus on lead vocal duties.

The band enlisted Alex Lifeson from fellow Canadian rockers Rush to perform guitar solos on two songs on the album, "Crying Over You" and "Holy Water". A song entitled "Alien Shore" is the sixth track on Rush's 1993 album Counterparts.

The album was released as a mini-concept album with the b-side (starting with "Lost in Space") containing various songs with a science fiction theme and narrative.

Track listing 
Side 1
 "Situation Critical" (Mark Holmes) – 3:31
 "Crying Over You" (Holmes) – 3:39
 "Red Light" (Holmes, Sergio Galli) – 2:50
 "It Ain't Love Anyway" (Holmes) – 3:12
 "Somebody Somewhere" (Holmes) – 4:06
Side 2
"Lost In Space" (Holmes, Galli) – 4:04
 "Temple of the Newborn" (Kenny MacLean) – 4:02
 "Holy Water" (Holmes, MacLean) – 3:41
 "Animal" (Holmes) – 4:31
 "Hungry Eyes" (Holmes, Galli) – 4:38

Credits 
Platinum Blonde:
 Sergio Galli: guitar, backing vocals
 Mark Holmes: lead vocals
 Kenny MacLean: bass, keyboards, backing vocals
 Chis Steffler: drums, percussion

with "special guest musicians":
 Bruce Barrow
 Claude Desjardins
 Lou Pomanti
 Alex Lifeson: guitar solos on 2, 8
 Dalbello: backing vocals on 3, 7, 8
 Earl Seymour: saxophone solo on 5
 Randall Wyse: vocal chant on 7

It is not noted on the actual album package which specific instruments the first three listed musicians played, but Barrow is normally a bassist, Desjardins a drummer/keyboardist, and Pomanti a keyboard player/bassist.

Engineers:
 Eddy Offord, Ed Stone

Pre-production on 2, 6, 9:
 David Tyson

References

1985 albums
Platinum Blonde (band) albums
CBS Records albums
Albums produced by Eddy Offord
Albums recorded at Metalworks Studios